Kravchuk polynomials or Krawtchouk polynomials (also written using several other transliterations of the Ukrainian surname ) are discrete orthogonal polynomials associated with the binomial distribution, introduced by  .
The first few polynomials are (for q = 2):
 
 
 
 

The Kravchuk polynomials are a special case of the Meixner polynomials of the first kind.

Definition
For any prime power q and positive integer n, define the Kravchuk polynomial

Properties
The Kravchuk polynomial has the following alternative expressions:

Symmetry relations 
For integers , we have that

Orthogonality relations
For non-negative integers r, s,

Generating function
The generating series of Kravchuk polynomials is given as below. Here  is a formal variable.

See also
 Krawtchouk matrix
 Hermite polynomials

References

.
.

External links

Krawtchouk Polynomials Home Page
"Krawtchouk polynomial" at MathWorld

Orthogonal polynomials